Kashiwazaki may refer to:

Places
 Kashiwazaki, Niigata

People
 Katsuhiko Kashiwazaki